Denis Gizatullin (born 11 March 1983 in Oktiabrsky, Russia) is a former international motorcycle speedway rider and former captain of the Russian national team.

Career
He is a two times Russian champion.

He first rode in the British leagues in 2007 for Eastbourne Eagles. Although he only rode one match in 2007 he returned to the club for the 2012 and 2013 seasons.

Career history

World Championships 
 Individual U-21 World Championship
 2004  Wrocław - 14th place (4 points)
 Speedway World Cup
 2003 - 8th place (5th place in Race-Off - 2 points)
 2005 - 7th place (4th place in Event 1 - 2 points)
 2006 - 3rd place in Qualifying Round 1 (13+2 points)
 2007 - 6th place (4th place in Race-Off - 0 points)
 2008 - Semi-Final 1 will be on 2008-07-12

European Championships 
 Individual European Championship
 2007  Wiener Neustadt - 6th place (9 points)
 2008  Lendava - The Final will be on 2008-08-23 (Winner of Semi-Final 1)
 Individual U-19 European Championship
 2001  Pardubice - track reserve (1 point)
 2002  Daugavpils - 7th place (8 points)
 European Pairs Championship
 2004 - Winner of Semi-Final 2 (9 points)
 2005 - 4th place in Semi-Final 1 (5 points)
 2007  Terenzano - 3rd place (9 points)
 European Club Champions' Cup
 2009 -  Toruń - 3rd place (10 pts) Vladivostok

Russian Championships 
 Russian Individual Speedway Championship
 2004 - 2nd place
 2005 - 3rd place
 2006 - 2nd place
 2007 - Champion
 2008 - Champion
 Individual U-21 Russian Championship
 2002 - Champion
 2003 - 2nd place
 2004 - Champion
 Team Russian U-21 Championship
 2003 - 2nd place
 2004 - 2nd place

See also 
 Russia national speedway team
 List of Speedway Grand Prix riders

References 

1983 births
Living people
Russian speedway riders
Polonia Bydgoszcz riders
Eastbourne Eagles riders
Russian expatriate sportspeople in Poland
Sportspeople from Bashkortostan